The Tunisia national beach soccer team, nicknamed Les Aigles de Carthage (The Eagles of Carthage or The Carthage Eagles), represents Tunisia in international beach soccer competitions and is controlled by the Tunisian Football Federation, the governing body for football in Tunisia.

Tournament records
 Champions   Runners-up   Third place   Fourth place  

Red border color indicates tournament was held on home soil.

Africa Beach Soccer Cup of Nations

See also 
 Tunisia national football team
 Tunisia national minifootball team
 Tunisia national futsal team
 Tunisia national American football team

African national beach soccer teams
Beach Soccer